Some Pun'kins is a 1925 American silent comedy drama film directed by Jerome Storm and starring Charles Ray, Duane Thompson, and George Fawcett. It is also known by the alternative title of The Farmer's Boy.

Plot
As described in a review in a film magazine, in this  light rural comedy, Lem Blossom (Ray) falls in love with Mary Griggs (Thompson), already the possessor of a beau in the worldly person of Tom Perkins (Cooley). Mary's pa Josh Griggs (Woodruff), a heavy drinking father, frowns on the romance but Lem persevers. When Lem fails to sell a load of pumpkins, his father (Fawcett) in desperation turns to bootlegging. Mrs. Blossom (Midgley) and Lem smell the bottles, and Pa Blossom drives Lem away. On the way to the station Lem conceives the idea of obtaining a corner on pumpkins and puts it over to the tune of thousands of dollars. Mary's house takes fire and Lem, after trying the fire-pumper he invented, risks his life to save her life. Everything, then is rosy. Lem has both money and the affections of the young woman.

Cast

Preservation
With no prints of Some Pun'kins located in any film archives, it is a lost film.

References

Bibliography
 Buck Rainey. Sweethearts of the Sage: Biographies and Filmographies of 258 Actresses Appearing in Western Movies. McFarland, 1992.

External links

1925 films
1926 comedy films
1926 films
American silent feature films
Films directed by Jerome Storm
American black-and-white films
1925 comedy films
1920s English-language films
1920s American films
Silent American comedy films